Sayyidah Zaynab Mosque is a mosque located in the city of Sayyidah Zaynab, in the southern suburbs of Damascus, Syria. According to Twelver Shia Muslim tradition, the mosque contains the grave of Zaynab, the daughter of ‘Alī and Fātimah and granddaughter of Muhammad. Ismaili Shia tradition place Zaynab's tomb in the mosque of the same name in Cairo, Egypt. The tomb became a centre of Twelver religious studies in Syria and a destination of mass pilgrimage by Twelver Shia Muslims from across the Muslim world, beginning in the 1980s. The zenith of visitation normally occurs in the summer. The present-day mosque that hosts the tomb was built in 1990.

Specifications
The shrine of Sayyidah Zainab is located in the south of Damascus where called Al-Sayyida Zainab. This area is part of Damascus Rif Province. The building of the shrine consists of a large courtyard with a square plan. It included a dome and two high Minaret. The Minarets and walls of the courtyard and porches were tiled by Iranian artists,  the roof and walls of the shrine were glazed from the inside and the dome was gilded from the outside. On the eastern side of the courtyard, the building of the Zeinabieh's prayer hall with a small courtyard has been built. A new courtyard has also recently been built on the north side of the Holy Shrine. The shrine is sometimes seen by some as a place of miracles.

The shrine has been managed by the Mourtada's (آلُ مُرْتَضَى) family since the fourteenth century. Financially, the shrine has been funded mainly by the Iranian government following 1979.  Given their financial investment, the ideological direction of the shrine and the prayer hall follow Ayatollah Khamanei. The Lebanese Hezbollah displays several posters and sets at the shrine.

Several Shia scholars and celebrities such as Seyyed Mohsen Amin Ameli, and Seyyed Hossein Yousef Maki Ameli are buried in the shrine of Sayyidah Zainab and the surrounding cemeteries. Ali Shariati, the Iranian ideologue of the Islamic Revolution of 1979, had wished before his death, to be buried in the yard of Zaynab bint Ali, the descendant of Muhammad and beloved daughter of Imam Ali. His shrine is found within the compound of Sayyidah Zaynab Mosque and is regularly visited by many Iranian pilgrims.

Recent history
On 27 September 2008, a car bomb attack took place on the intersection leading up to the mosque, killing 17 people.

On 14 June 2012, the town became the target of a suicide car bomb attack where around 14 people were heavily wounded.

Since mid-summer 2012, the town has been under attack from armed militants in neighbouring Sunni towns. Many Shia and pro government families were driven out of their homes in southern Damascus and sought refuge in Sayyidah Zaynab. Constant shelling became more frequent in this predominantly Shia town, and rockets landing on random places in the town became common.

On 31 January 2016, at least 60 people were killed in three bomb blasts in the Koa sodhda area, near the shrine. At least another 110 people were also wounded in the blasts, caused car bombs.

According to the Times of Israel on 21 May 2022, citing a Twitter account which follows Israeli military activity in Syria, it was alleged that "the strikes targeted sites in the suburb of Sayyidah Zaynab, south of Damascus".

Gallery

See also
 Al-Sayeda Zainab Mosque - A mosque in Cairo, Egypt where is also considered as the place of burial of Sayyida Zainab according to Sunni and Ismaili Shia tradition.
 Bab Saghir
 Holiest sites in Islam (Shia)
 Jannat al-Baqi'
 Jannat al-Mu'alla
 Sayyidah Ruqayya Mosque

References

External links 
 

20th-century mosques
Architecture in Syria
Family of Muhammad
Islamic holy places
Mausoleums in Syria
Shia mosques in Syria
Twelver Shi'ism
Tourist attractions in Syria
Shia shrines
Mosques completed in 1990